Reddam House is an independent, co-educational, non-denominational, day school, located in Woollahra (pre-school to Year 9) and North Bondi (Years 10 to 12), both Eastern Suburbs of Sydney, New South Wales, Australia. Reddam House was acquired by Inspired Education Group in 2019. It subsequently switched to for-profit status and now receives no government funding.

The school was launched in Sydney by Graeme Crawford in June 2000, who had founded Crawford College, South Africa in 1992. It was established following a major renovation at the previous Taylors College in North Bondi.

The school attracted media attention with reports 36 percent of students, six times the state average, received "special consideration" in the 2006 HSC. Reddam House has also received media attention for being the only non-selective school to achieve a top 10 ranking in the Higher School Certificate of 2013, 2016, 2018, 2019, 2021 and 2022. In the 2022 HSC, Reddam ranked at 5th overall, its highest ever ranking.

History
Reddam House started as a Years 7 to 11 school in 2001 at the current Bondi campus. The school grew quickly and a new campus at Woollahra, near Bondi Junction railway station, was opened in 2003. The new Woollahra Ccmpus enabled the opening of the Reddam House Primary School (Years K to 6) and the restructuring of the High School into a High School (Woollahra) and a Senior School (Bondi). The Woollahra campus is also home to the Early Learning School, accepting children from one year of age.

Facilities
The Reddam House Bondi campus hosts Years 10, 11 and 12. The Woollahra Campus hosts pre-school to Year 9.
Reddam also has brother schools started by members of the Crawford family. In Cape Town, South Africa Reddam Atlantic Seaboard and Reddam Constantia were started by Sheena Crawford-Kempster. In Johannesburg, South Africa Reddam, Bedfordview (Main Campus and BCC Campus) were started by Robert Crawford and Dalene Quayle.

List of other Reddam House schools

South Africa
 Reddam House Ballito, Ballito
 Reddam House Atlantic Seaboard, Cape Town
 Reddam House Constantia, Constantia, Cape Town
 Reddam House Durbanville, Durbanville
 Reddam House Somerset, Somerset West
 Reddam House Umhlanga, Umhlanga
 Reddam House Helderfontein, Fourways
 Reddam House Bedfordview, Bedfordview
 Reddam House Waterfall, Midrand
United Kingdom
 Reddam House Berkshire, Wokingham

Old Reddamians
Ben Pasternak, founder of Monkey, Inc.
Megan Aimee Jones, Artist and painter 
Lady Kitty Spencer, British Model

See also 
 List of non-government schools in New South Wales

References

External links

Educational institutions established in 2000
North Bondi, New South Wales
Private primary schools in Sydney
Private secondary schools in Sydney
Woollahra, New South Wales
2000 establishments in Australia